Noblesville Commercial Historic District is a national historic district located at Noblesville, Hamilton County, Indiana.   It encompasses 54 contributing buildings in the central business district of Noblesville. It developed between about 1875 and 1931, and includes notable examples of Gothic Revival, Italianate, and Renaissance Revival style architecture. Located in the district is the separately listed Hamilton County Courthouse Square, which includes the courthouse (1877-1879) and Sheriff's Residence and Jail (1875). Other notable buildings include the Indiana Union Traction Company Station (1906), Lacy Block (1888), Evers Block (1889), U.S. Post Office (1906), U.S. Post Office (1931), and First Christian Church (1897-1898).

It was listed on the National Register of Historic Places in 1991.

References

Historic districts on the National Register of Historic Places in Indiana
Gothic Revival architecture in Indiana
Italianate architecture in Indiana
Renaissance Revival architecture in Indiana
Historic districts in Hamilton County, Indiana
National Register of Historic Places in Hamilton County, Indiana